Simon Ganneau (born circa 1805 in Lormes, died 14 March 1851 in Paris) was a French socialist, feminist, sculptor, and mystic.

Like several other socialists of his time, Ganneau treated Christianity as a call for social reform. He was influenced by Barthélemy Prosper Enfantin and Saint-Simonian philosophy, particularly in viewing God as an androgynous or bisexual. Ganneau's writings treat androgyny not only as a move towards religious salvation, the final stage of humanity, but also as embodying the socialist concept on unity and balance in the world.

Adopting the title of the Mapah, a combination of mater and pater or maman and papa ("mother" and "father"), Ganneau presented himself as an androgynous prophet (with a beard and a woman's cloak)<ref name="Lachman">Gary Lachman, Revolutionaries of the Soul' (2014), page 43</ref> of a new religion called "Evadaism" based on his ideas for "a redefined humanity, Evadam" (from Eve-Adam) and for a new era of female emancipation, gender equality and social justice.Francis Bertin, Esotérisme et socialisme (1995), page 53 According to Éliphas Lévi, Ganneau also claimed to be the reincarnation of Louis XVII, and his wife claimed to be the reincarnation of Marie Antoinette.Éliphas Lévi, Histoire de la magie (Paris, Germer Baillière, 1860), pp. 519-525

As a sculptor and a former phrenologist, he spread his ideas via pamphlets and plaster figurines, "of strange appearance, without doubt symbolically bisexual", both called "plasters". His garret studio apartment on the Île Saint-Louis in Paris functioned in the late 1830s as a salon for discussing his ideas, and he influenced many of the socialists and feminists of his time, including Alexandre Dumas, Alphonse Esquiros, Flora Tristan and Éliphas Lévi (Abbé Constant). Ganneau contributed to Tristan's 1844 collection The Worker's Union, as well as to an 1848 paper titled La Montagne de la Fraternité.

Ganneau had a wife and child, who was five when Ganneau died in 1851, whom Théophile Gautier took under his wing: the Orientalist and archaeologist Charles Simon Clermont-Ganneau.André Dupont-Sommer, "Un dépisteur de fraudes archéologiques : Charles Clermont-Ganneau (1846-1923), membre de l'Académie des Inscriptions et Belles-Lettres", Comptes-rendus des séances de l'Académie des Inscriptions et Belles-Lettres, April 1974, pp. 591-592

 References 
Notes

Citations

 Further reading 
 "Nouvelles ecclésiastiques", L'Ami de la religion, no. 2994, 17 July 1838; Baptême, Mariage (Paris, de Pollet, Soupe et Guillois, 1838)
 "Mort du créateur d'une religion nouvelle", A. Bonnetty, Annales de philosophie chrétienne'', 4th series, (Paris, 1852), p. 164

External links

1805 births
1851 deaths
French feminists
French socialists
Founders of new religious movements